St. Augustine's Catholic Church is a historic church in Napoleon, Ohio, United States. Located on the edge of the city's downtown, two blocks away from the Henry County Courthouse, the church is a prominent landmark in Napoleon.

History
St. Augustine Parish was founded at some point between 1856 and 1858; its first priest was Michael Pietz. The parish was dedicated to St. Augustine  in honor of Augustine Pilliod, who supervised the construction of its first building. This structure was replaced with the current church, which was built at a cost of $21,893. Although construction was largely completed in 1881, the altars were not installed until 1888.

Architecture
St. Augustine's Church has been rated a fine example of Gothic Revival architecture: both its exterior and its interior feature many examples of the style. A high ceiling, supported by many Gothic arches, rises above the sanctuary and its elaborate wooden altar and pews. Stained glass windows on the front, rear, and sides of the church provide light to the interior. The entire structure rests on a stone foundation; at the time of construction, small windows lit the basement, but these windows have since been closed with concrete blocks. Other small alterations have been made to the building over the years, including the replacement of the original front doors and wooden steps and the removal of crosses on the building's corners.

Three buildings associated with the church are located nearby. A two-story brick rectory, bought by the parish in 1925, sits behind the church, while a Catholic school lies next door. Across Clinton Street from the church is located a convent of the Sisters of Notre Dame, a two-story Italianate building constructed in 1862.

The tall brick Gothic tower of St. Augustine's Church places its architecture in stark contrast to another historic church on the edge of downtown Napoleon. First Presbyterian Church, located on Washington Street four blocks southwest of St. Augustine's, features an American Gothic exterior built of multicolored sandstone.

Recent history
In 1982, the church was added to the National Register of Historic Places for its architectural significance. It is one of four buildings in Henry County that are listed on the Register; the others are the county courthouse, the sheriff's house and jail, and First Presbyterian Church. It remains an active parish of the Diocese of Toledo and its Our Lady Queen of Peace Deanery.

References

Further reading
Aldrich, Lewis Cass. History of Henry and Fulton Counties, Ohio. N.p.: D. Mason, 1888.

External links
Church website
Profile from the Diocese of Toledo

Roman Catholic churches completed in 1881
19th-century Roman Catholic church buildings in the United States
Gothic Revival church buildings in Ohio
Buildings and structures in Henry County, Ohio
National Register of Historic Places in Henry County, Ohio
Churches on the National Register of Historic Places in Ohio
Churches in the Roman Catholic Diocese of Toledo
1856 establishments in Ohio
Churches in Henry County, Ohio
Napoleon, Ohio